Tato was a 6th-century king of the Lombards.

Tato may also refer to:

People
 Tato (name), a given name and surname (including a list of persons with that name)

 Tato, nickname of Jaume Morales Moltó (born 1973), player of Valencian pilota
 Tato, a character in the 1980s Spanish comics Chicha, Tato y Clodoveo

Music
 Tato (band), an Indonesian music band from Jember in medio 1996.

See also
 Tato Awards, Argentinian television awards
 Villa El Tato, an urban fragment in the Canelones Department of southern Uruguay